Castelmayran is a commune in the Tarn-et-Garonne department in the Occitanie region in southern France.

History

Lordship of Castelmayran
In the 12th century, the lordship belonged to a branch of the family of Argombat which founded the Cistercian abbey of Belleperche. And by 1143 the final transfer of the abbey was discussed at a meeting held in Castelmayran.

Castelmayran had several co-seigneurs over time, among whose Nicolas de Gourgues, the last one before the French Revolution.

Lectoure and Lomagne
Before 1789, Castelmayran was a city of Gascony, in the diocese of Lectoure, and election of Lomagne.

Administration

The mayor of Castelmayran is Thierry Jamain, re-elected in 2020.

Notes and references

Notes

References

See also
Communes of the Tarn-et-Garonne department

External links
 

Communes of Tarn-et-Garonne